Alvania debruynei is a species of minute sea snail, a marine gastropod mollusk or micromollusk in the family Rissoidae.

Distribution

Description 
The maximum recorded shell length is 1.2 mm.

Habitat 
Minimum recorded depth is 0 m. Maximum recorded depth is 0 m.

References

Rissoidae
Gastropods described in 2004